Ninetta Vad (born 1989) is a Hungarian sprint canoer who has competed since the late 2000s. She won a silver medal in the K-1 4 x 200 m event at the 2010 ICF Canoe Sprint World Championships in Poznań. In June 2015, she competed in the inaugural European Games, for Hungary in canoe sprint, more specifically, Women's K-2 500m and the K-4 500m Gabriella Szabó, Anna Kárász, and Danuta Kozák. She earned a bronze medal in the K-2 500m and a gold within the Women's K-4 500m.

External links
Héraklész.hu profile. 

1989 births
Hungarian female canoeists
Living people
ICF Canoe Sprint World Championships medalists in kayak
European Games medalists in canoeing
European Games gold medalists for Hungary
Canoeists at the 2015 European Games
European Games bronze medalists for Hungary